Events from the year 1835 in Germany

Incumbents
 Kingdom of Prussia
 Monarch – Frederick William III of Prussia (16 November 1797 – 7 June 1840)
 Kingdom of Bavaria
 Monarch - Ludwig I (1825–1848)
 Kingdom of Saxony
 Anthony (5 May 1827 – 6 June 1836)
 Kingdom of Hanover
 William IV (26 June 1830 to 1837)
 Kingdom of Württemberg
 William (1816–1864)

Events 
 3 October – The Staedtler Company (pencil manufacturers) is founded by J. S. Staedtler in Nuremberg, Germany.
 November/December – The German Federal Convention prohibits circulation of work by members of the "Young Germany" group of writers (Karl Gutzkow, Heinrich Heine, Heinrich Laube, Theodor Mundt and Ludolf Wienbarg) and the exiled poet Heinrich Heine.
 7 December – The Bavarian Ludwig Railway opens between Nuremberg and Fürth, with a train hauled by the British-built Der Adler ("The Eagle"), the first railway in Germany.
unknown dates
 David Strauss begins publication of Das Leben Jessu, kritisch bearbeitet ("The life of Jesus, critically examined") in Tübingen.
 Cell division is first observed under the microscope by German botanist Hugo von Mohl as he works over green algae Cladophora glomerata.

Births 

 24 June – Johannes Wislicenus, German chemist (d. 1902)
 7 October – Felix Draeseke, German composer (d. 1913)
 31 October – Adolf von Baeyer, German chemist, Nobel Prize laureate (d. 1917)
 6 December – Wilhelm Rudolph Fittig, German chemist (d. 1910)

Deaths 

 18 March – Christian Günther von Bernstorff, Danish, Prussian statesman, diplomat (b. 1769)
 4 April – Friedrich August von Klinkowström, German artist, author and teacher (born 1778)
 8 April – Wilhelm von Humboldt, German linguist, philosopher (b. 1767)
 18 August – Friedrich Stromeyer, German chemist (born 1776)
 20 August – Friedrich Rehberg, German portrait and historical painter (born 1758)
 20 November – Joseph von Baader, German railway pioneer (b. 1763)
 29 November – Princess Catharina of Württemberg, wife of Jérôme Bonaparte (b. 1783)

References 

Years of the 19th century in Germany
Germany
Germany